Vandyke is an unincorporated community in Buchanan County, Virginia, in the United States.

History
A post office was established at Vandyke in 1909, and remained in operation until it was discontinued in 1951. Henry Vandyke was an early postmaster.

References

Unincorporated communities in Buchanan County, Virginia
Unincorporated communities in Virginia